The spotfin betta or Brunei beauty (Betta macrostoma) is a species of labyrinth fish endemic to the island of Borneo.

References

Fauna of Brunei
Betta
Taxa named by Charles Tate Regan
Fish described in 1910
Taxonomy articles created by Polbot
Freshwater fish of Borneo